Cornelia Neuhaus (born 20 June 1967 in Münster as Cornelia Löwenberg) is a German writer.
She is best known for her crime thrillers set in the Taunus near Frankfurt.

She has also published romantic novels under her maiden name Löwenberg, as well as horse stories for teenagers.

Bibliography
 Unter Haien (Swimming With Sharks)
 Sommer der Wahrheit (as Nele Löwenberg)
 Straße nach Nirgendwo (as Nele Löwenberg)

Bodenstein/Kirchhoff series
 Eine unbeliebte Frau (#1 An Unpopular Woman - published 2019)
 Mordsfreunde (#2 Murder Friends - published 2019)
 Tiefe Wunden (#3 The Ice Queen / Deep Wounds - published 2019)
 Schneewittchen muss sterben (#4 Snow White Must Die - published 2010)
 Wer Wind sät (#5 Who Sows the Wind - published 2012)
 Böser Wolf (#6 Bad Wolf / Big Bad Wolf - published 2013)
 Die Lebenden und die Toten (#7 I Am Your Judge / To Catch a Killer / The Living and the Dead - published 2015)
 Im Wald (#8 In The Forest - published 2017)
 Muttertag (#9 Mother's Day - published 2019)

Further reading 
 Oliver Mayer: Popular German Crime Fiction: Nele Neuhaus and her Bestselling Novels; In: Studies in Foreign Languages & Literature, Vol. 50, p. 45–60. Link to full text

References

External links

1967 births
Living people
German crime fiction writers